Fulvene (pentafulvene) is a hydrocarbon with the formula (CH=CH)2C=CH2. It is a prototype of a cross-conjugated hydrocarbon. Fulvene is rarely encountered, but substituted derivatives (fulvenes) are numerous.  They are mainly of interest as ligands and precursors to ligands in organometallic chemistry.

See also 
Fulvalene
Methylenecyclopropene

References

Hydrocarbons
Vinylidene compounds
Cyclopentadienes